The Red Book is a trademark of Gamestuff Inc and an unauthorized edition of Chivalry & Sorcery (C&S) role playing game. Its name comes from the red cover of the official first edition. All successive Red Book editions took the same design. Editions of Red Book after the first are named in addition to numbered: Phoenix (2nd), Chimera (3rd), Gorgon (4th), Manticore (5th), Hydra (6th) and Minotaur (7th). Red Book preserves the cover and typeface of the first edition of C&S. C&S was originally created in 1977 by two Canadian game designers, Edward E. Simbalist and Wilf K. Backhaus, and first published by Fantasy Games Unlimited (FGU), an American editor. The second edition was also published by FGU (1983), the third by Highlander Designs (1996), the fourth (2000) and the fifth (2020) by Britannia Game Designs, an English editor.

C&S: the Red Book
Published in 2000 by Wilf Backhaus and Hugh Tyreman. This free download pdf was published by Gamestuff Inc, a gaming company based in Camrose, Alberta. C&S Red Book was a reprinting of the original 1977 edition of C&S with a larger typeface size and some minor additions. It was produced under license from Wilf K. Backhaus, Maple Leaf Games Ltd (the game company of Ed. Simbalist who died in March 2005), and Britannia Game Designs Ltd (BGD) by Gamestuff Inc. At that time Simbalist and Backhaus officially parted, since Wilf Backhaus did not take part in the writing of C&S4: the Rebirth. This edition is the only authorized version, even if its legality seems to be in question. All successive versions are unlicensed and have the same cover as the first edition published by FGU in 1977. Nonetheless, the Red Book has been continuously updated by fans over the years and is available as a pdf.

C&S Red Book 2: Phoenix
Published in 2009, this version appears to be based on Red Book. The work contains many unlicensed references to Middle Earth's Tolkien universe and it restores the Black Magick spells that disappeared since the third edition. The cover is a copy of the original first edition cover art.

Changes made from the original C&S Red Book:
 three new classes (Spy, Inquisitor, Dark Knight)
 new clerical fighting orders
 plagues & diseases
 new weapons for monsters
 new drugs & poisons
 the Inquisition
 the Opus Dei
 Druidism
 Druidic cults & Deities
 Elves, Dwarves & Hobbits lifestyles
 new spells & Black Magick
 the magicians part 3
 new magic weapons & armors
 new magic items
 extended monsters descriptions
 new monsters
 designing monsters
 Archaeron

C&S Red Book 3: Chimera
In 2011, another edition of 338 pages was released as a free downloadable pdf. This version contains the last writings of Wilf Backhaus, who died in October 2009 and the full supplement "Arden", one of the nations in the Archaeron campaign of the designers of Chivalry & Sorcery that was first published by FGU in 1979. This edition kept the original game's mechanics, but focused on background material such as Demonology. At that time, an official fifth edition was still in development. When C&S Chimera was issued, BDG attempted to protect its trademarks.

Changes made from C&S RB Phoenix:

 new elven races (Noldor: High Elves, Sindar: Grey Elves and Nandor: Wood Elves)
 2 new religions: paganism and wotanism
 the place of women in the feudal society
 the free companies
 the exorcist, new character class
 the saints
 churches of Evil for Dark Knights
 the Summoner, a new type of magician
 occult books
 backfire table
 symbols of guard
 circles of power and summoning
 spells of summoning
 Demonology: infernal origin, hierarchy in hell, the Watchers, possessions, Cardinal pacts
 Angelology: angelic hierarchy, angelic appearance, archangels, powers of angels
 the medieval cities
 new monsters
 the full supplement of Arden with original maps

C&S Red Book 4: Gorgon
One year after the release of C&S, a new version of 489 pages was launched on the internet as a free downloadable pdf. This version was named C&S Red Book fourth to avoid confusion with the (then) future official fifth edition. This edition kept the original game's mechanic and contains old/unpublished writings and articles of Ed. Simbalist, who died in March 2005, and Wes Ives, a major contributor to the first edition of C&S. The full supplement "Saurians", the world of intelligent dinosaurs that was published by FGU in 1979, had been included in the appendix.

Changes made from C&S RB Chimera:

 the Nephilims: a new race
 skills
 the medieval castle
 crimes & punishments
 torture during the Middle Ages
 the Herald
 Fighting orders organization
 a Warrior Monk Day Planner
 Holy relics
 The Blessings of the Valar
 Ogham
 White Magick
 Witchcraft Organisation
 Demon weapons & Demon armors
 creating a medieval world
 customs of feudal society
 playing evil
 the full supplement Saurians

C&S Red Book 5: Manticore
In June 2013, a new 666-page version was released as a free downloadable pdf. Like the official second edition boxed set of Chivalry & Sorcery published by FGU, this version is divided into three core rulebooks, followed by appendices.

 Book 1 discusses character creation, skills, virtues and flaws, experience and advancement.
 Book 2 discusses combat, feudal age, tournaments, castles, warfare and monsters.
 Book 3 discusses magick, magical combat, demons, angels and the pantheon of Middle-earth (unlicensed by the Tolkien Estate).

The appendices contain expansions, modules and supplements published by FGU.
Despite the fact that all Red Book editions bear the logo of FGU, Scott Bizar, the CEO of the company, claims he has nothing to do with them, and since Backhaus' death in 2009, the editors remain anonymous. A group calling itself the "Loyal Order of Chivalry & Sorcery Revival Team" began making announcements on behalf of Red Book editors. Originally Wilf Backhaus founded the LOCS in September 1996 as a means of keeping alive interest in C&S.

Changes made from C&S RB Gorgon:

 a new race: the Half-Elven
 the Nordic Barbarians
 Paladins & Dark Knights
 the agricultural year
 heraldry for monsters
 seals
 army organisation
 how to play a vampire
 the Nordic magick users
 the ancient runes
 new spells
 The DragonLord and The Songsmith: 2 modules for C&S

C&S Red Book 6: Hydra
Published in May 2014, this new version of 864 pages was released on the internet and is divided into nine books: This version contains two extensions that were advertised a long time ago by FGU but never published: "Crusaders", a supplement covering the time of the Crusades in the Holy Land; and "King Arthur", the mythic England of Arthurian legends. The writings of Isaac Bonewits about the C&S magick system were also included.

Hydra was organized in nine books.

 book 1: the great campaign (180 pages)
 book 2: the book of chivalry (158 pages)
 book 3: the book of sorcery (146 pages)
 book 4: warfare (34 pages)
 book 5: crusaders (80 pages)
 book 6: King Arthur (86 pages)
 book 7: Saurians (66 pages)
 book 8: the campaign book (80 pages)
 book 9: the appendices (22 pages)

C&S: World of the Troll-Head

In August 2015, a new variant of the original C&S Red Book was made available. This edition of 235 pages was an adaptation of OC&S1 and OC&S2 with a few clarifications, expansions and house rules. The book provided rules for creating characters in the feudal realms of the Troll Head: a vast continent where many different cultures live.
Unlike previous editors of the Red Book, the World of the Troll-Head authors Jean-Marc Pinaud and Guy-Franck Richard did not remain anonymous. Their version was made available for download on the website associated with their online campaign Galapiat.

C&S Red Book 7: Minotaur

One year after the release of C&S Troll-Head, a new Red Book version called Minotaur was published online as a free downloadable pdf. This edition totalled 964 pages divided into 11 chapters:

 book 1: the great campaign (160 pages)
 book 2: those who pray (90 pages) - NEW -
 book 3: the book of chivalry (98 pages)
 book 4: the book of sorcery (126 pages)
 book 5: Creatures Bestiary (86 pages) - NEW -
 book 6: warfare (36 pages)
 book 7: crusaders (100 pages)
 book 8: King Arthur (86 pages)
 book 9: Saurians (66 pages)
 book 10: the campaign book (80 pages)
 book 11: the appendices (22 pages)

References

External links 
 C&S 1st Edition review 
 Gamestuff Inc. homepage link broken as of 08:07, 15 December 2017 (UTC)

Chivalry & Sorcery
Fantasy role-playing games

de:Chivalry and Sorcery
fr:Chivalry & Sorcery
it:Chivalry and Sorcery